Billy's Hollywood Screen Kiss is a 1998 American independent, gay-themed romantic comedy film written and directed by Tommy O'Haver and starring Sean P. Hayes, Brad Rowe, and Meredith Scott Lynn. The film was a breakthrough performance for Hayes, who would go from this film to his role as Jack McFarland on the hit television show Will & Grace.

Plot
Midwest native Billy Collier is an aspiring photographer in Los Angeles, who has had little artistic success and much romantic frustration. While out to coffee with his roommate Georgiana, he comes up with the idea of recreating iconic screen kisses from Hollywood movies. That night at a party, Billy's friend Perry agrees to finance the project. Billy serendipitously runs into their coffee waiter Gabriel, whom he recruits to model.

Billy becomes infatuated with Gabriel, but cannot figure out if Gabriel is really straight. Gabriel claims he has a girlfriend in San Francisco, but sends ambiguous signals. At Perry's invitation, the two attend an exhibit by photographer Rex Webster, who tries to poach Gabriel as a model (and potential trick). Webster offers to take Gabriel to Catalina Island for an underwear ad shoot, sparking Billy's jealousy. Back at Gabriel's place, Billy and Gabriel seem to be getting closer but their rapport is interrupted by a phone call from Gabriel's girlfriend Natalie.

Billy shoots his first setup with Gabriel, a recreation of Burt Lancaster and Deborah Kerr's kiss on the beach in From Here to Eternity. Following the shoot, Gabriel tells Billy that his relationship with Natalie is over. Billy mentions the Kinsey scale, on which Billy describes himself as a "perfect six," but Gabriel admits he does not know where on the scale he falls. Back at Billy's apartment, they continue to talk and drink and Gabriel asks if he can spend the night on the couch. Billy suggests that Gabriel sleep in his bed (ostensibly because of Gabriel's height), to which Gabriel eventually agrees. When the two are in bed, Billy makes tentative overtures, to which Gabriel seems to respond initially; however, Gabriel suddenly pulls away, after which Billy apologizes and gets up to sleep on the couch.

Gabriel gets the underwear modeling job and goes to Catalina. Billy follows after him to Catalina with Georgiana, who is on the rebound from a tumultuous relationship with her boyfriend Andrew. On the island, she hooks up with drug-addled island resident "Gundy". Billy crashes Rex Webster's underwear shoot looking for Gabriel, but does not find him. He eventually tracks him down later that night at Rex's party, and they talk on the beach.

Billy relates to Gabriel how confused he was when he came out, saying, "I swore to myself that if I could ever be there for somebody, I would, so that that person wouldn't have to go through all the shit I went through. What I'm trying to say is, if you're having problems figuring out where you stand, even if you're not sure of what you're supposed to want-" Abruptly, however, before Billy can finish, one of Gabriel's fellow male models walks up to them. Billy instantly realizes that the two of them are in some kind of relationship with each other, and though Gabriel tries to soften the blow, a humiliated and hurt Billy rebuffs him. Perry later consoles Billy by telling him that he, too, had fallen for someone who did not return his affections; he confesses that man to be Billy. The next morning, Georgiana has ditched Gundy, and both she and Billy head back home.

The movie ends with the opening of Billy's "Hollywood Screen Kiss" series exhibition in Los Angeles, which includes his photos of Gabriel. The exhibit appears to be very successful, and Billy receives many congratulations from various visitors. Perry shows Billy a magazine with an underwear ad featuring Gabriel and suggests that Billy give him a call, but he decides against it. Towards the end of the night, Billy meets a handsome young man, Joshua, who enthusiastically admires Billy's work. It is suggested that along with his newfound artistic success, Billy may at last find romantic fulfillment as well.

Cast
 Sean P. Hayes as Billy Collier
 Brad Rowe as Gabriel
 Richard Ganoung as Perry
 Meredith Scott Lynn as Georgiana
 Matthew Ashford as Whitey
 Armando Valdes-Kennedy as Fernando
 Paul Bartel as Rex Webster
 Holly Woodlawn as Holly
 Christopher Bradley as Andrew
 Robbie Cain as Joshua
 Carmine D. Giovinazzo as Gundy
 Les Borsay as Les
 Jason-Shane Scott as Brad
 Kimiko Gelman as Donna
 Annabelle Gurwitch as Gallery Owner

Production
The film is a remake of writer/director O'Haver's earlier short film Catalina.

The film is punctuated with Billy's fantasy sequences of himself and Gabriel in pastiches of romantic film scenes, including the aforementioned From Here to Eternity and the films of Fred Astaire. Billy carries a Polaroid camera with him everywhere, and his reminiscences are illustrated with Polaroid photographs. The film in fact opens with such a monologue, with Billy relying on a series of Polaroids while relating how he grew up gay "in a small town in Indiana, where there's plenty of corn, fast cars, and straights. Lots and lots of straights. I mean, a lot." Billy's opening narrative demonstrates his awareness that he is in a film and breaking the fourth wall.

Several scenes in the movie are backed up by classic songs of bygone times sung by notable and lesser known divas; these are lip-synced by more or less the same troupe of drag queens, a running gag throughout the film.

Reception
On the film review aggregator website Rotten Tomatoes, the film holds an approval rating of 78% based on 23 reviews, with an average rating of 6.71/10. The website's critical consensus reads, "Insubstantial yet charming, Billy's Hollywood Screen Kiss tells a love story that's as rooted in classic Hollywood as it is in timely themes".

Home media
Billy's Hollywood Screen Kiss was released on Region 1 DVD on December 22, 1998.

Soundtrack
The soundtrack was released on compact disc on August 11, 1998. The track listing is as follows:

 "Do What You Wanna" – Ramsey Lewis
 "Love Me or Leave Me" – Nina Simone
 "The Harem of Guadaloupe/Mystic Tango"*
 "Happy Heart" – Petula Clark
 "The Love Slave of Catalina" – Tonya Kelly
 "This Is My Song" – Petula Clark
 "Theme for Rex Webster"*
 "Moon over Quito"*
 "Cuban Love Song" – Xavier Cugat
 "Gabriel's Room"*
 "Happy Heart" (Junior Vasquez remix) – Petula Clark
 "Georgiana" - Carmine D. Giovinazzo

The film’s original score was composed by Alan Ari Lazar.

Awards and nominations
 Deauville Film Festival Grand Special Prize (nominated)
 Sundance Film Festival Grand Jury Prize - Dramatic (nominated)
 Verzaubert - International Gay & Lesbian Film Festival Rosebud Award for Best Film (won)

References

Bibliography

External links
 
 

1998 LGBT-related films
1998 romantic comedy films
1998 films
American LGBT-related films
American romantic comedy films
1990s English-language films
Films directed by Tommy O'Haver
LGBT-related romantic comedy films
Trimark Pictures films
Gay-related films
1998 directorial debut films
1998 independent films
Films scored by Alan Lazar
Films set in Los Angeles
1990s American films